Hugo Urruti (born 16 August 1987) is an Argentine footballer.

External links
 Hugo Urruti at Football Lineups
 

1987 births
Living people
Argentine footballers
Argentine expatriate footballers
Racing de Córdoba footballers
Tiro Federal footballers
Ñublense footballers
Primera B de Chile players
Expatriate footballers in Chile
Association football fullbacks
Footballers from Rosario, Santa Fe